East Bengal Club may refer to:

 East Bengal F.C.
East Bengal F.C. Reserves
East Bengal F.C. Academy
East Bengal F.C. (women)

 East Bengal Club (cricket)